Ruby is the debut album by American rock group Ruby, featuring Tom Fogerty.

Track listing

Personnel

 Tom Fogerty – guitar, vocals
 Randy Oda – guitar, keyboards, vocals
 Anthony Davis – bass, vocals
 Bobby Cochran – drums, vocals
 Ed Bogas - bass on "Baby, What You Want Me to Do"

Trivia
The instrumental track "BART" (named after the San Francisco Bay Area subway), was frequently used by the BBC to accompany test cards, during intervals between schools programmes, and over Pages from Ceefax in the late 1970s and early 1980s, and sporadically thereafter.

When the digital switchover happened, the track was chosen to play out the last Pages from Ceefax before the closure of analogue teletext in the UK, in October 2012.

Reception
A Cash Box Magazine album review dated April 9, 1977, states "It would be hard to follow the high quality work that Tom Fogerty put into Creedence Clearwater Revival but Fogerty's new band, Ruby, deserves more than a casual listen. The combined talents of this quartet are potently showcased in their ability to play fast and funky or slow and silky with equal aplomb and careful control. For AOR and top 40 playlists."

References

External links 

  (video, 5:35 minutes)

Tom Fogerty albums
1977 debut albums